Bramble Hill is a historic house in Rehoboth, Massachusetts.  The two-story masonry house was built c. 1923–28 to a design by Providence architect Albert Harkness, and is a locally unique example of the French Norman Revival style.  The exterior is in fieldstone, and its interior features extensive mahogany trim.  The entry hall has a basket-weave brick floor, and the main hall has a large stone fireplace and parquet floor.  It was commissioned by Doris Mather Briggs, a relative of the locally prominent Carpenter family, and is one of the few houses in the town for which an architect is known.

The house was listed on the National Register of Historic Places in 1983.

See also
National Register of Historic Places listings in Bristol County, Massachusetts

References

Buildings and structures in Rehoboth, Massachusetts
Houses on the National Register of Historic Places in Bristol County, Massachusetts
Houses in Bristol County, Massachusetts